Exuma II is the second studio album by Bahamian folk musician Exuma. It was released in 1970 on the Mercury Records label.

Reception

In a retrospective review, Richie Unterberger of AllMusic wrote that Exuma II "is perhaps a little less strange and a little more sedate" than Exuma's prior album, the self-titled Exuma (also released in 1970), "but only a little." Unterberger concluded, "While it might not be quite as striking as [Exuma's] previous album, certainly anyone who likes that debut will like [Exuma II] as well (and vice versa)". Mike Jahn of The Baltimore Sun referred to the track "Damn Fool" as "outstanding".

Track listing

Personnel

Adapted from the album's liner notes.
 Exuma – lead vocals, guitar, ankle bells, "sacred foot drum", mouth harp
 Bob Wyld (credited as Daddy Ya -Ya) – bass vocals, attar bells, elephant bells, marching drum
 Peppy, the SpyBoy – "high harmony", conga, "cabassa sacred sand"
 Lord Cherry – conga, whistles, group vocal
 Yogi – group vocal, junk bells
 Princess Diana – group vocal, whistles
 Sally O'Brien – group vocal, whistles
 Lord Wellington – conga

Production
 Daddy Ya-Ya – producer
 Bob Liftin – engineer

References

1970 albums
Exuma (musician) albums
Mercury Records albums